Sir Robert Mayer  (5 June 1879 – 9 January 1985) was a German-born British philanthropist, businessman, and a major supporter of music and young musicians.

Early life  
Mayer was born in Mannheim, Germany; his father was a brewer. From the age of 5 Mayer attended the Mannheim conservatoire, where, at the age of 11, he prepared a piano ballade by Brahms but was not chosen to perform it before the composer. However he sat next to Brahms during the concert. He also studied under Felix Weingartner.

His father however insisted that Mayer go into business. Initially he worked in the lace trade, and then, moving to London in 1896, became a banker, whilst continuing his piano studies with Fanny Davies and others. Mayer became a citizen of the United Kingdom in 1902, and joined the British army in the First World War.

Personal life 
His first wife, the soprano Dorothy Moulton Piper (d. 1974), an avant garde singer whom he married in 1919, encouraged him to continue his interest in music. Early in their married life, whilst living in the United States, Mayer came across the children's concerts organised by Walter Damrosch, and he was inspired by these to found the Robert Mayer Concerts for Children in 1923 (and later set up  'Youth and Music' , founded 1954, and affiliated to Jeunesses Musicales). The first series of concerts were conducted by Adrian Boult and Malcolm Sargent.

Mayer had three children, two of whom would go on to survive him: Adrian and Pauline. In 1980, aged 101, he remarried to Lady Jacqueline Mayer Noble.

Founding

In 1932, Mayer was one of the founders of the London Philharmonic Orchestra, and he also helped found the London Schools Symphony Orchestra in 1951. He was also involved, with Egon Wellesz, with the founding of the ISCM.

Centenarian

His 100th birthday in 1979 was a national celebration that included a gala concert at the Royal Festival Hall which was attended by Queen Elizabeth II. On the day of his 100th birthday he was a guest on the BBC's radio programme Desert Island Discs.  Later in that year Mayer, joined by Joyce Grenfell and Robin Ray, appeared as a guest on the BBC TV quiz Face The Music.

The Royal Philharmonic Orchestra under Bernard Keeffe played music by Ludwig van Beethoven, Benjamin Britten, Malcolm Arnold and Jean Sibelius, the most requested works as the result of a poll.

Although Chaim Weizmann referred to him as "an assimilated Jew", Mayer replied "I am a man, not a Jew or a non-Jew".

Autobiography 
Mayer published an autobiography titled My First 100 Years in 1979.

National Order 
He was created a Knight Bachelor in 1939, and was created a Companion of Honour (CH) in 1973. He was made a KCVO by the Queen in 1979.

References

Sadie, Stanley Sir Robert Mayer at 100, Musical Times vol.120 no.1636 (July 1979), pp. 457, 474–5
 

1879 births
1985 deaths
British businesspeople
British philanthropists
English centenarians
Knights Bachelor
Knights Commander of the Royal Victorian Order
Members of the Order of the Companions of Honour
Men centenarians
Businesspeople from Mannheim
German emigrants to the United Kingdom